Gola Bazar is a mohalla in Sherghati sub division of Gaya District in Bihar. This is the main market for the villagers that come from the surrounding villages of Sherghati. It can be regarded as the backbone of sherghati's whole economy, operated by a bunch of millionaire businessmen. It is the location of the Sheo Naryan Flour and Oil Mills that used to function a few decade back in Sherghati. Pramod Alankar jeweler is one of the oldest jewelry shop in that Location.

Cities and towns in Gaya district